The Zanzibar Nationalist Party (ZNP) was a nationalist and conservative Arab-dominated political party in Zanzibar. The ZNP, in a coalition with the African-dominated Zanzibar and Pemba People's Party (ZPPP), governed the island from 1961 to 1964.

Arab diaspora in Tanzania
Defunct political parties in Zanzibar
Nationalist parties in Africa
Tanzanian people of Arab descent
Political parties of minorities